The 2012–13 NCAA Division I men's ice hockey season began on October 6, 2012 and concluded with the 2013 NCAA Division I Men's Ice Hockey Tournament's championship game on April 13, 2013 at the Consol Energy Center in Pittsburgh, Pennsylvania. This was the 66th season in which an NCAA ice hockey championship was held and is the 119th year overall where an NCAA school fielded a team.

Polls

Pre-season
The top 20 from USCHO.com, October 1, 2012, and the top 15 from USA Today/USA Hockey Magazine, September 24, 2012. First place votes are in parentheses.

Regular season

Standings

2013 NCAA Tournament

Note: * denotes overtime period(s)

Player stats

Scoring leaders

  
GP = Games played; G = Goals; A = Assists; Pts = Points; PIM = Penalty minutes

Leading goaltenders

GP = Games played; Min = Minutes played; W = Wins; L = Losses; T = Ties; GA = Goals against; SO = Shutouts; SV% = Save percentage; GAA = Goals against average

Awards

NCAA

Atlantic Hockey

CCHA

ECAC

Hockey East

WCHA

See also
 2012–13 NCAA Division II men's ice hockey season
 2012–13 NCAA Division III men's ice hockey season

References

External links
USCHO.com 

 
NCAA